Dolní Žandov is a municipality and village in Cheb District in the Karlovy Vary Region of the Czech Republic. It has about 1,200 inhabitants.

Administrative parts
Villages of Horní Žandov, Podlesí, Salajna and Úbočí are administrative parts of Dolní Žandov.

Geography

Most of the municipal territory lies in the Upper Palatine Forest Foothills, the northeastern part lies in the Slavkov Forest. The hill Lesný, which is at  the highest point of the whole Slavkov Forest, is located in the municipality. Large part of Dolní Žandov belongs to the Slavkov Forest Protected Landscape Area.

References

Villages in Cheb District